Marcin Broniszewski (born 29 August 1980) is a Polish football manager. He is the current assistant manager of Zagłębie Sosnowiec.

References

1980 births
Living people
Polish football managers
Zagłębie Lubin managers
Wisła Kraków managers
Górnik Łęczna managers
Widzew Łódź managers
I liga managers
Polish expatriate sportspeople in Germany